Slobodskoy District is an administrative and municipal district (raion), one of the thirty-nine in Kirov Oblast, Russia. It is located in the north of the oblast. Its administrative center is the town of Slobodskoy (which is not administratively a part of the district). Population:  33,655 (2002 Census);

Administrative and municipal status
Within the framework of administrative divisions, Slobodskoy District is one of the thirty-nine in the oblast. The town of Slobodskoy serves as its administrative center, despite being incorporated separately as an administrative unit with the status equal to that of the districts.

As a municipal division, the district is incorporated as Slobodskoy Municipal District. The Town of Slobodskoy is incorporated separately from the district as Slobodskoy Urban Okrug.

People
 Alexander Bakulev (1890-1967)

References

Notes

Sources

Districts of Kirov Oblast
